Meble-Rys Gościbia Sułkowice is a Polish women's handball team, based in Sułkowice.

See also
 Handball in Poland
 Sports in Poland

Polish handball clubs
Sport in Lesser Poland Voivodeship
Myślenice County